Cora accipiter is a species of basidiolichen in the family Hygrophoraceae. It was formally described as a new species in 2016 by Bibiana Moncada, Santiago Madriñán, and Robert Lücking. The specific epithet, which refers to hawks of the genus Accipiter, alludes to the wing-shaped lobes of the lichen, and also honours mycologist David Leslie Hawksworth. The lichen is found in South America, where it grows in the wet páramo regions of the northern Andes. Closely related species include C. cyphellifera and C. arachnoidea.

References

accipiter
Lichen species
Lichens described in 2016
Lichens of South America
Taxa named by Robert Lücking
Basidiolichens